Mike Yurosek (September 28, 1922 – June 12, 2005) was a California farmer known as the "father of the baby carrot."

Baby carrot
While the "baby carrot" is extremely popular in the United States, it is not a separate breed but a way of processing regular full-sized carrots to increase utilization and decrease waste. Mike Yurosek and his son David promoted the baby carrot in the early 1980s in Bakersfield, California through their Bunny Luv produce company.  Major carrot companies followed their lead, and the baby carrot is now one of the industry's top sellers.

Family
Mike Yurosek was the uncle of actor Gary Lockwood.

References

Farmers from California
1922 births
2005 deaths
Place of birth missing
Place of death missing